Aclan Bates is an American film and theatre director who divides his time between Los Angeles and Ankara. He is a working actor/director in the Turkish State Theatres.

Stage and Film work

Director/Actor
2019 Directed Sarah Ruhl's The Clean House for the Turkish State Theatres, Ankara
2015 Directed the feature-length film Antikaci
2014 Directed Anton Chekhov's The Swan Song /A Marriage Proposal for the Turkish State Theatres, Ankara
2013 Performed in Unutma Beni as Cevher
2012 Performed in Taken 2 
2012 Directed Pinedus Affair
2011 Directed  A War Story at the Realto
2009 A Taxi to Jannas
2009 Josephine, Studio 52 as "Pepito" and "Juan Perón" Los Angeles
2008 Directed Melegin Sırları (Broken Angel) and performed as "Hakan"
2008 Lincoln Heights  "lead" Los Angeles
2007 Directed Standing By at the Matrix Theatre, Los Angeles
2006 Agır Roman (East Side Story), Istanbul National Ballet, Los Angeles Production at the Ford Amphitheatre, Production Supervisor
2005 Directed The Trial for Write Act Repertory Theatre: Los Angeles
2004 Produced and Directed Cesar Chavez Documentary
2004 Directed George Orwell's Animal Farm
2000–02 American Film Institute Hollywood, California Writer/Director
1991–2009 Turkish National Theatre, Ankara, Turkey

Actor/Director
1998–99 Jules Feiffer's Little Murders as "Kenny"
1996–98 Luigi Pirandello's Liola as "Liola"
1997–98 Directed Jean-Paul Sartre's The Flies
1996–98 David Hare's Skylight as "Edward"
1995–97 Anton Chekhov's The Seagull as "Treplev"
1994–95 Victor Haim's The Visitor as "Mataresco
1994–95 Directed Bertolt Brecht's The Good Person of Szechuan
1993–94 Georg Büchner's Woyzeck as Charlatan
1992–93 Necip Fazıl Kısakürek's Bir Adam Yaratmak (The Making of a Man) as "Mansur"
1991–92 One-man play, Kus by Coskun Irmak, Karalarin Memetleri as "Ali" by Cahit Atay, Ay Isiginda Samata as "Erol" by Haldun Taner, Genc Osman in various roles
1995–96 Turkish Radio and Television Ankara, Turkey

Actor 
Prime Time TV series Ferhunde Hanimlar as "Tayfun"
1991–99 TRT and Private Stations Ankara, Turkey

Education
2000—2002 American Film Institute, Directing. Hollywood, California. Masters of Fine Arts. Thesis Film:   Condemned
1995–1999 Ankara University, Education Sciences Faculty. Education Programs & Training. Ankara, Turkey Masters of Arts. Thesis:  Problems of Training Actors in Theatre Education Institutions
1991–1995 Hacettepe University, Ankara National Conservatory Theatre Department Ankara, Turkey Masters of Fine Arts Emphasis in Theatre Education and Directing
1987–1991 Hacettepe University, Ankara National Conservatory Theatre Department Ankara, Turkey. Bachelor of Arts

Translations
Beth Henley, Crimes of the Heart
David Mamet, Sexual Perversity in Chicago
George Orwell, Animal Farm (Nelson Bond's stage adaptation)
Sarah Ruhl, Eurydice
Sarah Ruhl, The Clean House
Sarah Ruhl, Late, A cowboy Song
Joe Masteroff, Cabaret
Alan Ball, Five Women Wearing the Same Dress
Sarah Kane, 4:48 Psychosis

References

External links 
2020 Anadolu Ajans syndicated review of Sarah Ruhl's The Clean House  (in Turkish)
2020 Milliyet Newspaper review of Sarah Ruhl's The Clean House Turkish National Theatre, Ankara  (in Turkish)

Aclan Bates bio on aktuelsinema.com (in Turkish)
2017 Haberaks TV interview (in Turkish) - Haber Media Group
2015 Anadolu Ajans article on the making of Antikaci (in Turkish)
2011 article on Aclan Bates in Hurriyet Newspaper (in Turkish)
2009 i nterview about Aclan Bates' Filmstar Performing Arts Center (in Turkish)
2008 Sinemalar.com interview with Aclan Bates about the making of Broken Angel (in Turkish)
2007 Article in Turks of America Magazine (v.5 issue 24) about Aclan Bates and Broken Angel (in English and Turkish) 
2002 InterSinema.com Article/Interview "A Turk in Hollywood" (in Turkish)
2002 InterSinema.com article "Warner Bros. in contract with a Turk" (in Turkish)
2000 Cumhuriyet Newspaper article about Aclan Bates' thesis film for AFI, Condemned (in Turkish)

American film directors
American film producers
Living people
Year of birth missing (living people)
American male actors
American expatriates in Turkey
American people of Turkish descent